James W. Burns  (1921 – February 11, 2019), was a director emeritus at the Power Corporation of Canada. He was an Officer of the Order of Canada. Burns's contribution to the nation as well as his hometown of Winnipeg, Manitoba has earned him national recognition and distinction. His latest project involved the construction of a state of the art Skateboard Park in downtown Winnipeg. He died in Winnipeg on February 11, 2019.

Education
Harvard Graduate School of Business Administration - Master of Business Administration
U. of Manitoba - Doctor of Laws

Previous Positions
The Great-West Life Assurance Co. - chr.
Power Financial Corp. - chr. and CEO
Power Corp. of Canada - pres.
The Great-West Life Assurance Co. - pres. and CEO

References

 University of Manitoba citation
 Order of Manitoba citation

Businesspeople from Winnipeg
Harvard Business School alumni
Officers of the Order of Canada
Members of the Order of Manitoba
Date of birth missing
2019 deaths
1921 births